Maria Grech Ganado (born 1943, in Lija), considered to be from Floriana, is a Maltese author and academic.

Education
Grech Ganado obtained her secondary education at St Joseph High School (Valletta) the Marija Regina Secondary School, in Hamrun. She attended the University of Malta where she obtained a BA in English Literature. She was awarded a second BA from the University of Cambridge. She went on to read for a Master's degree jointly between the University of Malta and the University of Heidelberg. She returned to Malta to take up an academic position in the Department of English at the University, and is notable for being the first Maltese female full-time lecturer at the University of Malta. She retired from teaching in 2003.

Literary work
Grech Ganado has written poetry in both Maltese and English, and is widely published. She has won the National Book prize for Poetry four times and received the first Maltese Poet Laureate award in 2020. Her work forms part of the National Curriculum at MATSEC level and has been translated into 12 other languages.

In 2000, Ganado Grech was awarded the Midalja għall-Qadi tar-Repubblika in recognition for her service to Maltese Literature. She also holds a Gieh il-Floriana award.

Personal life

Ganado Grech married Louis Grech in 1972, and they have three children; Xandru, Francesca and Louisa. She has spoken out about her struggle with mental health issues.

Bibliography

 Jum San Valentin
 Iżda Mhux Biss, 1999
 Skond Eva, 2001
 Ribcage, 2001
 Fil-Ħofra Bejn Spallejha, 2005
 Cracked Canvas, 2005 
 Memory Rap, 2005 
 Taħt il-Kpiepel t'Għajnejja, 2014
 Awguri, Giovanni Bonello!, 2016
 Framed, 2018

References

1943 births
Living people
20th-century Maltese poets
People from Lija
University of Malta alumni
Academic staff of the University of Malta
21st-century Maltese poets
Maltese women poets
English-language writers from Malta
Recipients of the National Book Prize